Pouteria vernicosa is a species of plant in the family Sapotaceae. It is found in Brazil and Peru.

References

vernicosa
Vulnerable plants
Trees of Peru
Taxonomy articles created by Polbot